Amit Bose may refer to: 

Amit Bose (born 1930), Indian filmmaker 
Amit Bose (government official), American attorney and transportation policy advisor

Human name disambiguation pages